The Royal Rock Beagles was a pack of beagles founded at Rock Ferry in 1845.  The pack was used to hunt hare in the Wirrall and subsequently in Wales as the character of the Cheshire countryside changed.  It was for a long time the oldest beagle pack in the UK but ceased to hunt in 2015.

References

See also
List of beagle, harrier and basset packs of the United Kingdom

1845 establishments in England
Hunting with hounds